Chen Yi (born 2 September 1998) is a Chinese field hockey player for the Chinese national team.

She participated at the 2018 Women's Hockey World Cup.

References

1998 births
Living people
Chinese female field hockey players
Female field hockey goalkeepers
Sportspeople from Dalian